Oscar Börje Leander (7 March 1918 – 30 October 2003) was a Swedish footballer. He played 249 matches as a midfielder for AIK and scored 25 goals, mostly successful penalty kicks. He also played 23 times for the Swedish national team, scoring four goals. He was part of the Swedish Olympic squad that won the gold medal in 1948 Summer Olympics. When Knut Nordahl was injured in the opening match against Austria, Leander stepped in as a substitute right-back, and stayed until the final, when Nordahl recovered.

Honours 
Sweden

 Summer Olympics: 1948

References

External links

 
 
 AIK.se stats
 AIK.se profile
 

1918 births
2003 deaths
Swedish footballers
Sweden international footballers
Allsvenskan players
AIK Fotboll players
Olympic footballers of Sweden
Olympic gold medalists for Sweden
Footballers at the 1948 Summer Olympics
Olympic medalists in football
Vasalunds IF players
Medalists at the 1948 Summer Olympics
Association football midfielders
People from Avesta Municipality
Sportspeople from Dalarna County